Carex aurea is a species of sedge known by the common name golden sedge. It is native to much of North America, including most of Canada and the western, upper Midwest, and northeastern United States. It grows in wet habitat, often on soils of a basic pH.

Description
The inflorescence produces staminate and pistillate flowers, the latter yielding rounded fruits. The fruit is coated in a sac called a perigynium which is fleshy and green at full size and then turns bright orange just before it falls off.

References

External links
Jepson Manual Treatment - Carex aurea
Flora of North America
Carex aurea - Photo gallery

aurea
Flora of North America
Plants described in 1818